Italy took 43 competitors to the 1978 European Athletics Championships which took place 29 August–3 September 1978 in Prague. Italy took five medals during the championships.

Medalists

Top eight

Men

Women

References

External links
 EAA official site

Nations at the 1978 European Athletics Championships
Italy at the European Athletics Championships
1978 in Italian sport